Claudio Maria Celli (born 20 July 1941), is an Italian prelate of the Roman Catholic Church. An archbishop, Celli was President of the Pontifical Council for Social Communications from 2007 to 2016.

Biography
Archbishop Celli was born in Rimini, and ordained to the priesthood on 19 March 1965. He graduated from the Pontifical Ecclesiastical Academy in 1966. In 1990, he became Undersecretary of the Relations with States (equivalent to foreign minister) section of the Vatican Secretariat of State.

On 16 December 1995, Celli was appointed Secretary of the Administration of the Patrimony of the Apostolic See and Titular Archbishop of
Cluentum. He received his episcopal consecration on 6 January 1996 from Pope John Paul II, with Archbishops Giovanni Battista Re and Jorge María Mejía serving as co-consecrators.

Pope Benedict XVI named him President of the Pontifical Council for Social Communications on 27 June 2007.

He stated in January 2008 that Catholic media "should not become...instruments of a religious or cultural fundamentalism". He continued: "Our media is directed not just to Catholics, but to all men...they don't exist only for–or are directed only to–people who already belong to the Church, rather they should also give careful attention to what exists in the soul of man, in his heart, where sometimes there can be distance from God, or many times, a deep nostalgia for God."

In January 2009, he announced an agreement with Google to build a joint venture giving Benedict XVI his own YouTube channel.

On 5 January 2011 he was appointed one of the first members of the newly created Pontifical Council for the Promotion of the New Evangelisation. Marking the 2012 World Day of Communications, Archbishop Celli, speaking on Pope Benedict's message of silence said, "the topic chosen by the Holy Father for this World Day of Social Communications is attentive to today’s communicative phenomena and invites us all to reflect on this fundamental point: Silence is an integral part of communication. This is why, when we wish communication to be genuinely human -- because it begins from one man and is addressed to other men -- the word that is communicated must be nourished by silence to be more meaningful, to be more true. Because it is in silence that I hear, it is in silence that I understand more attentively what are the needs, the sufferings, the search for the good and true that is in the heart of other men".

In September 2014 he was appointed a member of the Congregation for the Evangelization of Peoples.

References

External links

1941 births
Living people
21st-century Italian Roman Catholic titular archbishops
Pontifical Ecclesiastical Academy alumni
Pontifical Council for Social Communications
Members of the Pontifical Council for the Promotion of the New Evangelisation
Members of the Pontifical Council for Social Communications
Members of the Congregation for the Evangelization of Peoples
Members of the Congregation for Bishops
20th-century Italian Roman Catholic titular archbishops